Ichkovo is a rural locality (a village) in Matigorskoye Rural Settlement of Kholmogorsky District, Arkhangelsk Oblast, Russia. The population was 197 as of 2010.

Geography 
Ichkovo is located on the Severnaya Dvina River, 42 km south of Kholmogory (the district's administrative centre) by road. Pyakovo is the nearest rural locality.

References 

Rural localities in Kholmogorsky District